In database design, a lossless join decomposition is a decomposition of a relation  into relations  such that a natural join of the two smaller relations yields back the original relation. This is central in removing redundancy safely from databases while preserving the original data.

Criteria
Lossless join can also be called nonadditive.

Check 1: Verify join explicitly 

Check 2: Via functional dependencies 
Let  be a relation schema.

The decomposition is a lossless-join decomposition of  if at least one of the following functional dependencies are in + (where + stands for the closure for every attribute or attribute sets in ):

Examples
 Let  be the set of functional dependencies.

References

Databases
Data modeling
Database constraints
Database normalization
Relational algebra